Josep de Boltas (died 1795) was Bishop of Urgel and ex officio Co-Prince of Andorra from 1785 to 1795.
Born in Oran, Algeria, he became Bishop of Urgell and Co-prince of Andorra on 31 March 1785. During his ten years in office he steered a course of neutrality during the French Revolution. He contributed important legislative work and improved the health, economy and security of the region. He died in office in 1795.

References

1795 deaths
18th-century Princes of Andorra
Bishops of Urgell
Year of birth missing
People from Oran
18th-century Roman Catholic bishops in Spain